The 2019 VMI Keydets football team represented the Virginia Military Institute in the 2019 NCAA Division I FCS football season. It was VMI's 129th football season. The Keydets were led by fifth-year head coach Scott Wachenheim. They played their home games at 10,000–seat Alumni Memorial Field at Foster Stadium. They were a member of the Southern Conference (SoCon). They finished the season 5–7, 4–4 in SoCon play to finish in a three-way tie for fourth place. Their 5 wins were the most achieved in a single season since finishing 6–6 in 2003.

Previous season
The Keydets finished the 2018 season 1–10, 0–8 in SoCon play to finish in last place.

Preseason

Preseason media and coaches polls
The SoCon released their preseason media poll and coaches poll on July 22, 2019. The Keydets were picked to finish in 9th place in both polls.

Preseason All-SoCon teams
The Keydets placed four players on the preseason all–SoCon teams.

Offense

1st team

Javeon Lara – WR

2nd team

Reece Udinski – QB

Defense

1st team

A.J. Smith – DB

Specialists

2nd team

Rohan Martin – RS

Schedule

Source:

Projected depth chart

Game summaries

at Marshall

Mars Hill

at East Tennessee State

Robert Morris

Wofford

at The Citadel

Samford

at Mercer

Western Carolina

at Furman

at Army

Chattanooga

References

VMI
VMI Keydets football seasons
VMI Keydets football